Deborah J. Cook (born on October 5, 1960)  is a Canadian critical care physician. She is a Canada Research Chair of Research Transfer in Intensive Care at McMaster University and a Fellow of the Royal Society of Canada.

Early life and education
Cook was born on October 5, 1960 in Dundas, Ontario. She completed her undergraduate medical degree and internal medicine training at McMaster University, then pursued an advanced fellowship in critical care medicine at Stanford University. She returned to McMaster to complete her Master's degree in design, measurement, and evaluation, before joining the faculty in 1990.

Career
By the turn of the 21st century, Cook began serving as a professor in the Departments of Medicine, Clinical Epidemiology & Biostatistics, and co-chair of the CLARITY Research Group at McMaster. The following year, she was also the recipient of the inaugural Ministry of Training, Colleges and Universities Leadership in Faculty Teaching Award. Throughout her early tenure at McMaster, Cook focused her research on the prevention and management of deep venous thrombosis and pneumonia among critically ill patients. As a result, she was elected a Fellow of the Royal Society of Canada in 2009.

In 2013, Cook began the 3 Wishes Project which aims to "bring peace to the final days of a patient's life and to ease the grieving process." Within its first three years of implementation, the 3 Wishes Project enacted 630 wishes with an average cost of $20. Some wishes included a rock-and-roll singalong with their friends, bagpipes to be played at the moment of death, and lying in bed with their son. She was subsequently hailed as a world-leading expert in intensive care medicine and named a Member of the Order of Canada. Cook was also recognized by McMaster with the promotion to Distinguished University Professor and received the 2015 Elizabeth J. Latimer Prize in Palliative Care for "excellence and innovation in palliative care."

During the COVID-19 pandemic, Cook was selected for two task forces on controlling the coronavirus. She served on the multidisciplinary COVID-19 Expert Panel which was created to advise Mona Nemer on the latest scientific developments related to the disease. She was also a member of the task force on reprocessing of N95 masks or respirators. As a result of her expertise and research, Cook was awarded the Lifetime Achievement Award from the Society of Critical Care Medicine.

References

External links

1960 births
Living people
Academic staff of McMaster University
McMaster University alumni
21st-century Canadian women scientists
Canada Research Chairs
Members of the Order of Canada
Fellows of the Royal Society of Canada
21st-century Canadian physicians
Canadian women physicians